Zhongyue may refer to

Zhōngyuè or guoyue, music composed for Chinese musical instruments
Zhōngyuè, one of the Sacred Mountains of China
Zhongyue Village, Daweishan, Liuyang, Henan, China

People with the given name Zhongyue include:

Immanuel C. Y. Hsu; 1923–2005), sinologist at the University of California, Santa Barbara